Harikumar Krishnamoorthy (born 3 January 1989), better known as K. Hari Kumar, is an Indian novelist and screenwriter born in Cochin and brought up in Gurgaon. He did his schooling from DAV Public School. His first book When Strangers Meet was published in 2013, followed by That Frequent Visitor (2015), A Game of Gods (2016) and The Other Side Of Her (2018). He has penned the story and screenplay for E (Malayalam Movie) and the Hindi language psychological horror web-series Bhram (web series). He has been featured as one of the top horror writers of India. He has written 50 horror short stories which featured in the 2019 book called India's Most Haunted.

Personal life 
Harikumar Krishnamoorthy was born on 3 January 1989 in Tripunithura, Kerala, but grew up in Gurgaon, Haryana. After completing his engineering, he started making documentaries and short films with friends. In 2010, he fell ill and finished writing his first book When Strangers Meet, published in 2013 by Srishti Publishers. His second book That Frequent Visitor was published in 2015. The Other Side Of Her, is a psychological thriller published in 2018 and inspired the Hindi language web-series Bhram starring Kalki Koechlin, Sanjay Suri, Eijaz Khan, Bhumika Chawla, Omkar Kapoor, Rajendranath Zutshi and Harsh Vashisht.

Under the mentorship of filmmaker, Sangeeth Sivan, K Hari Kumar ventured into mainstream feature films with E (Malayalam Movie) which marks the comeback of actress Gautami in Malayalam cinema.

Bibliography

Books

Filmography

Film

Television

See also
 List of Indian writers

References

1989 births
Living people
Indian horror writers
Indian male screenwriters
Screenwriters from Kochi
Novelists from Kerala
People from Gurgaon
Indian male novelists
Indian writers